The Progressive Democratic Alliance (PDA) is a political alliance of Indian center-left political parties formed in 2020 Bihar Legislative Assembly election. The coalition is led by the Jan Adhikar Party (Loktantrik) from 2020.

Candidates

See also
 Grand Democratic Secular Front
 Mahagathbandhan (Bihar)
 National Democratic Alliance

References 

2020 Bihar Legislative Assembly election
2020s in Bihar
2020 elections in India